Prorocopis melanochorda is a moth of the family Noctuidae first described by Edward Meyrick in 1897. It is found in Australia.

References

Calpinae